was a Japanese modernist architect, city planner, and architectural scholar. He is noted for his application of methods of scientific research to the study of architecture and urban planning. Nishiyama served as a professor at Kyoto University for over 25 years, and produced a number of seminal writings on architectural theory.

The Uzo Nishiyama Memorial Library in Kyoto, which specializes in works relating to architecture and urban planning, is named after Nishiyama.

References 

20th-century Japanese architects
Modernist architects
Japanese urban planners
Architectural theoreticians
1911 births
1994 deaths
People from Osaka
Kyoto University alumni
Academic staff of Kyoto University